The Murder Trial of Doctor Jordan is a 1949 West German crime film directed by Erich Engels and starring Rudolf Fernau, Maria Holst, and Margarete Haagen. It was shot at the Wiesbaden Studios in Hesse. The film's sets were designed by the art directors Kurt Herlth and Carl Ludwig Kirmse.

Cast

References

Bibliography

External links 
 

1949 films
West German films
German crime films
1949 crime films
1940s German-language films
Films directed by Erich Engels
German black-and-white films
1940s German films